Day of Vengeance is the fifth studio album by Ukrainian folk metal band Holy Blood. It was released on December 31, 2014, in Russia through Musica Production and on May 18, 2015, in the rest of the world through Bombworks Records.

Background and history
On December 21, 2013, Fedor Buzilevich uploaded a demo of a new song titled "Holy Blood" to his official Facebook profile. On December 25, it was added to his YouTube channel and Holy Blood's official website, while also announcing the band was in the studio.

On January 24, 2014, Buzilevich updated the band's official website, revealing the title of their upcoming album to be Day of Vengeance. He stated the album would be released in the spring of 2014 on Bombworks Records, would include 8 new songs, and the band would begin touring for the album by the end of the summer of that year.

On February 18, the band's official website was further updated, revealing a complete lineup change occurred, with the exception of Buzilevich. As a result, Buzilevich wrote and recorded the album by himself.

On March 23, Buzilevich announced that he had completed recording the album. He also unveiled the cover art of the album on his Facebook profile, and made two more songs available for streaming on Holy Blood's official website, titled "Steel Sword" and "I Believe in God".

Sound
Buzilevich revealed in an interview that the album would be a departure of the band's previous folk metal sound in favor of a melodic death metal sound, though there will be some elements of folk metal, viking metal and doom metal still present.

Cover art
In early January 2014, Buzilevich commented on the upcoming cover art of the album, saying:

On February 18, the cover art was discreetly revealed as a thumbnail after the official website's discography section was updated. It was officially revealed on Buzilewicz's Facebook profile on March 23. The cover was created by Vitaliy Tretyakov, a close friend of the band.

On May 22, Tretyakov commented on the concept of the album cover, saying:

Track listing

Personnel
Holy Blood
Fedor Buzilevich – lead vocals, guitars, bass

Additional musicians
Slava Malinin – drums

Production
Matt Hunt – producer
Vitaliy "Triptych" Tretyakov – cover art, design, layout
Eugenia Buzilevich – promotional representative

References

Holy Blood (band) albums
2014 albums